The 2014–15 Kansas Jayhawks men's basketball team represented the University of Kansas in the 2014–15 NCAA Division I men's basketball season, which was the Jayhawks' 117th basketball season. The Jayhawks played their home games at Allen Fieldhouse. They were led by 12th year head coach Bill Self and were members of the Big 12 Conference. Despite losing 8 players, 5 who received substantial playing time, from the previous season, the Jayhawks still entered the season ranked 5th in the AP and Coaches poll, due in large part to a recruiting class ranked in the top 10 by Scout (4th), Rivals (3rd), and ESPN (9th). They finished the season 27–9, 13–5 in Big 12 play to finish win their 11th consecutive Big 12 regular season championship. They advanced to the championship game of the Big 12 tournament where they lost to Iowa State. They received an at-large bid to the NCAA tournament where they defeated New Mexico State in the second round before losing in the third round to cross state opponent, Wichita State. The Jayhawks 40–72 loss to Kentucky is the fewest points scored by Kansas in a game since the introduction of the shot clock in the 1985–86 season.

Preseason

Departures

Transfers

Recruiting

|-
| colspan="7" style="padding-left:10px;" | Overall recruiting rankings:      Scout: 4     Rivals: 3       ESPN: 9 
|}

Roster

Schedule

|-
!colspan=12 style="background:#00009C; color:white;"| Exhibition

|-
!colspan=12 style="background:#00009C; color:white;"| Non-conference regular season

|-
!colspan=12 style="background:#00009C; color:white;"| Big 12 regular season

|-
!colspan=12 style="background:#00009C; color:white;"| Big 12 Tournament

|-
!colspan=12 style="background:#00009C; color:white;"| NCAA tournament

Rankings

*AP does not release post-tournament rankings

References

Kansas Jayhawks men's basketball seasons
Kansas
2014 in sports in Kansas
2015 in sports in Kansas
Kansas